Events in the year 2010 in Brazil.

Incumbents

Federal government
 President: Luiz Inácio Lula da Silva 
 Vice President: José Alencar Gomes da Silva

Governors
 Acre: Binho Marques
 Alagoas: Teotônio Vilela Filho
 Amapa: Waldez Góes (until 4 April), Pedro Paulo Dias de Carvalho (4 April-31 December)
 Amazonas: Eduardo Braga (until 31 March), Omar Aziz (starting 31 March)
 Bahia: Jaques Wagner
 Ceará: Cid Gomes
 Espírito Santo: Paulo Hartung
 Goiás: Alcides Rodrigues
 Maranhão: Roseana Sarney
 Mato Grosso: Blairo Maggi then Silval da Cunha
 Mato Grosso do Sul: André Puccinelli
 Minas Gerais: Aécio Neves (until 31 March), Antônio Anastasia (starting 31 March)
 Pará: Ana Júlia Carepa
 Paraíba: José Maranhão
 Parana: Roberto Requião de Mello e Silva then Orlando Pessuti
 Pernambuco: Eduardo Campos
 Piauí: Wellington Dias (until 2 April), Wilson Martins (starting 2 April)
 Rio de Janeiro: Sérgio Cabral Filho
 Rio Grande do Norte: Wilma Maria de Faria
 Rio Grande do Sul: Yeda Rorato Crusius
 Rondônia: Ivo Narciso Cassol (until 31 March), João Aparecido Cahulla (starting 31 March)
 Roraima: José de Anchieta Júnior
 Santa Catarina: Luiz Henrique da Silveira (until 25 March), Leonel Pavan (starting 25 March)
 São Paulo: José Serra (until 2 April), Alberto Goldman (starting 2 April)
 Sergipe: Marcelo Déda
 Tocantins: Carlos Henrique Gaguim

Vice governors
 Acre:	Carlos César Correia de Messias
 Alagoas: José Wanderley Neto 
 Amapá: Pedro Paulo Dias de Carvalho 
 Amazonas: Omar José Abdel Aziz 
 Bahia: Edmundo Pereira Santos
 Ceará: Francisco José Pinheiro 
 Espírito Santo: Ricardo de Rezende Ferraço 
 Goiás: Ademir de Oliveira Meneses 
 Maranhão: João Alberto Souza 
 Mato Grosso: Silval da Cunha Barbosa 
 Mato Grosso do Sul: Murilo Zauith 
 Minas Gerais: Antonio Augusto Junho Anastasia (until 31 March), vacant thereafter
 Pará: Odair Santos Corrêa 
 Paraíba: Luciano Cartaxo Pires de Sá 
 Paraná: Orlando Pessuti 
 Pernambuco: João Soares Lyra Neto
 Piauí: Wilson Martins (until 2 April), vacant thereafter
 Rio de Janeiro: Luiz Fernando Pezão
 Rio Grande do Norte: Iberê Ferreira (until 31 March), vacant thereafter
 Rio Grande do Sul: Paulo Afonso Girardi Feijó 
 Rondônia: João Aparecido Cahulla
 Roraima: vacant
 Santa Catarina: Leonel Pavan (until 25 March), vacant thereafter
 São Paulo: Alberto Goldman (until 2 April), vacant thereafter
 Sergipe: Belivaldo Chagas Silva 
 Tocantins: Eduardo Machado Silva

Events
 
 December 30 (2009) – January 6: January 2010 Rio de Janeiro floods and mudslides
 February 17: Sinking of the Concordia
 April 5: April 2010 Rio de Janeiro floods and mudslides
 April 15: 2010 IBSA summit
 April 16: 2nd BRIC summit
 May 8: Miss Brasil 2010 
 June: 2010 Northeastern Brazil floods 
 November 21–28: 2010 Rio de Janeiro Security Crisis

Elections

 Brazilian general election, 2010
 Brazilian gubernatorial elections, 2010 
 Opinion polling in the Brazilian presidential election, 2010

Founded

 Revista Autismo magazine.
 Revista Santástico magazine. 
 Rádio Santos and Santos TV.
 Canal Viva TV channel. 
 Universidade Federal da Integração Latino-Americana university.
 Cidade Nova Station subway station. 
 Funvic Brasilinvest-São José dos Campos cycling team. 
 Liga Brasileira de Futebol Americano, American Football league.
 Whitejets airline.

Football Clubs

 Cordino Esporte Clube, Foz Cataratas Futebol Clube, Igreja Nova Futebol Clube, Novoperário Futebol Clube, Clube Atlético Portal, São José Esporte Clube (women) and União Frederiquense de Futebol

Film

 List of Brazilian films of 2010
 List of 2010 box office number-one films in Brazil

Television

Debuted

 Busão do Brasil
 El clon Spanish remake of O Clone
 Escrito nas Estrelas
 Passione (telenovela)
 Por Um Fio
 Ribeirão do Tempo
 The Buzz
 Uma Rosa com Amor

Ended

 Bela, a Feia
 Busão do Brasil
 Cama de Gato
 Caras & Bocas
 El clon
 Escrito nas Estrelas
 Poder Paralelo
 Topa ou Não Topa
 Uma Rosa com Amor
 Seize the Day

Music
 João Lucas & Marcelo form.
 Fellini stop performing. 
 First year of SWU Music & Arts

Sport

Football

 2010 in Brazilian football
 2010 Copa Libertadores Finals
 Brazil at the 2010 FIFA World Cup
 2010 Copa Libertadores Femenina
 2010 Torneio Internacional Cidade de São Paulo de Futebol Feminino

Tennis

 2010 Brasil Open 
 2010 BH Tennis Open International Cup 
 2010 Aberto de Brasília
 2010 Aberto de Bahia

Racing

 2010 Brazilian Grand Prix
 2010 São Paulo Indy 300
 2010 Rally International of Curitiba
 2010 FIA GT1 Interlagos round 
 2010 Desafio Internacional das Estrelas
 2010 FIA WTCC Race of Brazil
 2010 Formula 3 Brazil Open
 2010 GT Brasil season
 2010 Stock Car Brasil season
 2010 Copa Chevrolet Montana season
 2010 Fórmula Truck season
 2010 Formula 3 Sudamericana season
 2010 Trofeo Linea season

Misc

 2010 Panamerican Men's Youth Handball Championship
 2010 USA-Brazil Challenge 
 Brazil at the 2010 Winter Olympics
 Brazil at the 2010 Summer Youth Olympics
 Brazil participate in the 2010 South American Rugby Championship "A"

See also 
2010 in Brazilian football

 
2010s in Brazil
Years of the 21st century in Brazil
Brazil
Brazil